= Rörsjöparken =

Park in Malmö, Sweden

Coordinates: 55.60489°N 13.01725°E

Rörsjöparken is a park in Malmö, Sweden. The park was completed in 1905.

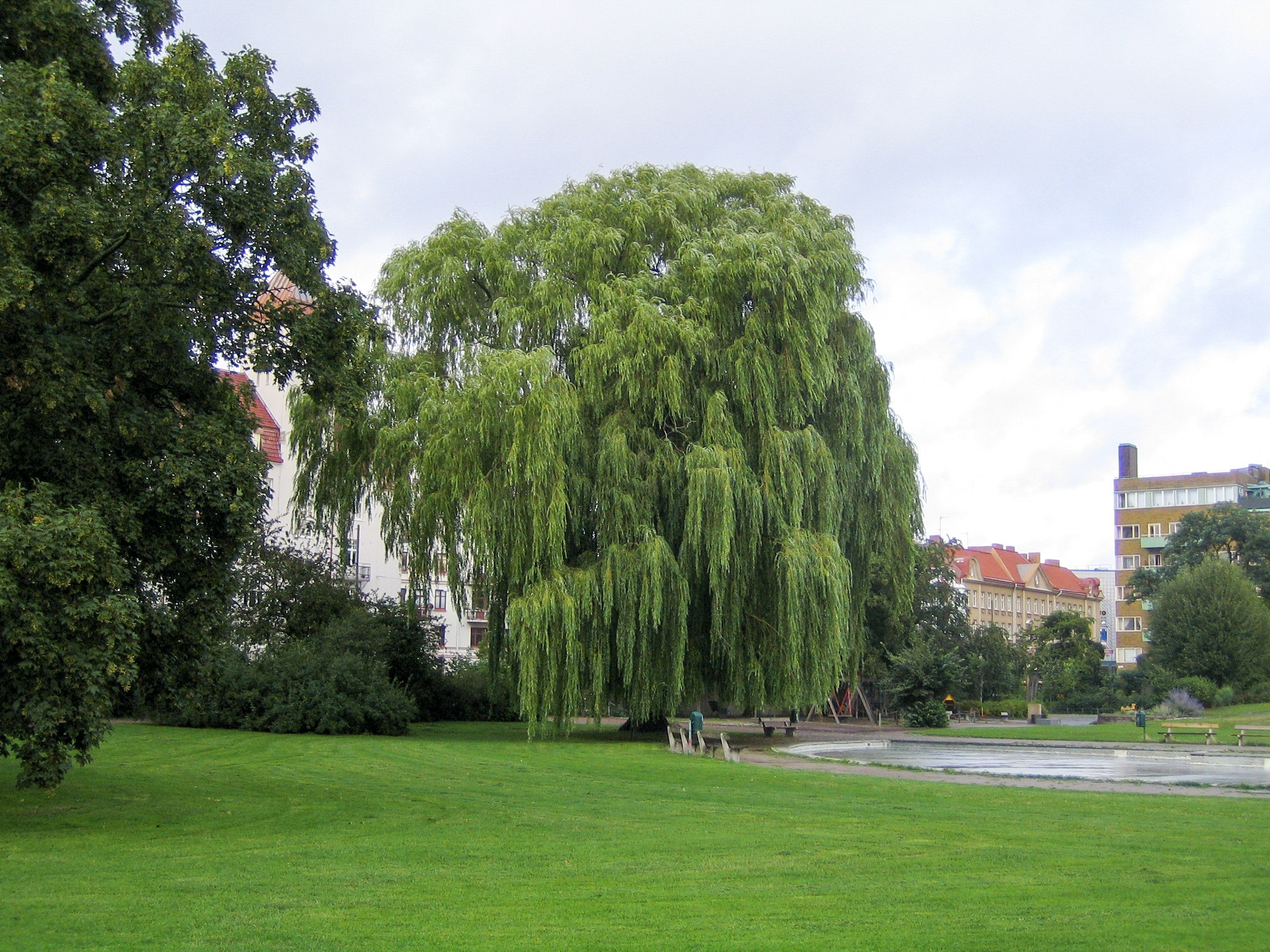
